Bay City, also known as the Manila Bay Freeport Zone and Manila Bay Area, is the name for the reclamation area on Manila Bay located west of Roxas Boulevard and the Manila–Cavite Expressway in Metro Manila, the Philippines.  The area is split between the cities of Manila and Pasay on the north side and Parañaque on the south.

History
The plan was to reclaim 3,000 hectares of land in Manila Bay. The project, formerly known as Boulevard 2000, was initiated by Imelda Marcos in 1977, with the creation of the Public Estate Authority (now Philippine Reclamation Authority) to manage the project. By the end of the Marcos rule in 1986, 660 hectares had been reclaimed, including the  Cultural Center of the Philippines Complex. On January 25, 2017, President Rodrigo Duterte signed Executive Order No. 35 and was organized as Manila Bay Freeport Zone.

Description
Bay City is administratively divided between the villages of Barangay 719 of Malate, Manila and Barangay 76 of Pasay in the northern Cultural Center of the Philippines Complex-Financial Center Area (CCP-FCA) section, and the villages of Barangay 76 of Pasay and Baclaran, Tambo and Don Galo of Parañaque in the southern Central Business Park and Asiaworld section.

The area is most well known for being home of the SM Mall of Asia, the third largest mall in the Philippines, Aseana City, an integrated mixed use central business district serving the Bay Area, Entertainment City with Las Vegas-style casinos, amusement parks, theaters, office building, hotels, residential buildings and resorts. The project is under the Philippine Amusement and Gaming Corporation (PAGCOR) owned by the Philippine government. It lies on the western side of Roxas Boulevard in Parañaque and south of the SM Mall of Asia Complex. Investments to the project could reach up to $15 billion, which was scaled down from the more recent $20 billion budget announcement that had been previously announced in 2007. The first integrated resort complex to open in Entertainment City is Bloomberry-owned Solaire Resort & Casino on March 16, 2013. It was followed by City of Dreams Manila (soft opening December 14, 2014), Okada Manila (opened December 2016) and Resorts World Bayshore (opening in 2018). Although the PEA advertises Bay City as the "new business capital" of Manila, development is proceeding slowly.

The main road in this area is Macapagal Boulevard which runs north–south through the center of Bay City. It is accessible from Ninoy Aquino International Airport via the NAIA Expressway, and from the Makati CBD, Ortigas Center and Bonifacio Global City via EDSA.

Developments

Cultural Center of the Philippines Complex

The  Cultural Center of the Philippines Complex covers the northernmost portion of Bay City and is under the jurisdiction of two cities, Manila (where it is part of the district of Malate) and Pasay. It is bounded by Manila Bay to the north and west, the Philippine Navy headquarters to the northeast, Roxas Boulevard to the east, and Jose Diokno Boulevard to the south. It is divided into two zones: the Art Zone, and the Commercial and Entertainment Zone. It features several brutalist structures designed in the 1960s and 1970s by Leandro Locsin, such as the Tanghalang Pambansa, the Philippine International Convention Center, and the Sofitel Philippine Plaza Manila. Other locators in the complex include the Coconut Palace, the Manila Film Center and Star City amusement park.

Financial Center Area

The  Financial Center Area covers the southern half of the CCP-FCA island. It is the first land to be reclaimed under the Boulevard 2000 project of the Philippine Reclamation Authority. It is bounded by Jose Diokno Boulevard to the north, and the Libertad Channel to the south. The area includes the Philippine National Bank complex which also houses the Philippine Airlines headquarters, World Trade Center Metro Manila, Philippine Trade Training Center and the Government Service Insurance System complex which hosts the Senate of the Philippines.

Central Business Park

The Central Business Park (CBP) island covers the central portion of Bay City and is divided into three sections. The SM Central Business Park contains the corporate headquarters of SM Prime Holdings, as well as the  SM Mall of Asia shopping mall complex which houses the Galeón museum and the SM by the Bay promenade. It also hosts the Mall of Asia Arena, SMX Convention Center Manila, Conrad Manila, the Shrine of Jesus Church and a ferry terminal of the Metrostar Ferry. In the  Metropolitan Park of Metrobank, the main locators are the BlueWave and Blue Bay Walk strip malls, Met Live shopping mall, Manila Tytana College and Le Pavilion. Other locations included in the said area are the DD Meridian Park of DoubleDragon Properties, a  mixed-use development which houses the DoubleDragon Plaza and Hotel 101, and Walter Mart's W Mall.

Immediately to the south are the CBP I-B and I-C lots occupied by the Aseana Business Park and PAGCOR's  Entertainment City which is home to four multi-billion dollar casinos and integrated resorts: Solaire Resort & Casino, City of Dreams Manila, Okada Manila and the upcoming Westside City. The Aseana Business Park (Aseana City) is the location of the  Neo-Chinatown, Aseana 1-3 Office Buildings, Singapore School Manila, The King's School, Manila, Ayala Malls Manila Bay, Department of Foreign Affairs – Office of the Consular Affairs, S&R Membership Shopping Aseana, and the Church of Saint John Paul II.

Asiaworld and Cyber Bay City

In the southern portion of Bay City in Parañaque lies Asiaworld, also known as Marina district, a  property owned by the family of Tan Yu which contains mostly residential developments such as the gated community of Marina Baytown Village and Burgundy residential towers. It is also the location of the former Uniwide Sales Coastal Mall which formerly housed the Southwest Integrated Bus Terminal (SWITS). The Parañaque Integrated Terminal Exchange (PITx), the successor to SWITS, is situated near the north end of the Manila–Cavite Expressway. The area hosted Michael Jackson's HIStory World Tour concert in December 8 and 10, 1996 in front of 110,000 people.

South of Asiaworld is Freedom Island and two smaller islands collectively known as Three Islands (formerly Amari). The area is planned to contain the Cyber Bay City with the Golf Residential Community District serving as its anchor development. It would also provide other sports facilities and would contain open parks, schools, retail and residential components. The project was stalled due to the PEA-Amari scandal during the term of President Fidel V. Ramos. At present, the islands are protected as a Ramsar site known as the Las Piñas–Parañaque Critical Habitat and Ecotourism Area.

See also
 Land reclamation in Metro Manila
 Entertainment City
 Las Vegas Strip
 Miami, Florida
 Los Angeles
 Bangkok, Thailand

References

External links
 Philippine Reclamation Authority

Districts in Metro Manila
Land reclamation in the Philippines
Manila Bay
Manila
Pasay
Parañaque
Mixed-use developments in Metro Manila
Planned communities in the Philippines
Entertainment districts in the Philippines
Redeveloped ports and waterfronts in the Philippines